The National Institute of Ear, Nose and Throat, Bangladesh is a specialized hospital and training center in ear, nose and throat (Otorhinolaryngology) diseases located in Tejgaon, Dhaka, Bangladesh. Construction of the institute began in 2009 and the new 12-storied building was inaugurated by the Prime Minister of Bangladesh, Sheikh Hasina on June 19, 2013.
When fully functional the 250-bed specialized institute would have an international standard audio-vestibular lab, sleep lab and voice study lab. It would act as an important center for training professionals in treating ENT disorders. The current director of the hospital is Prof. Dr. Mohammad Abdullah.

References

Hospitals in Dhaka
Otorhinolaryngology organizations